Joey Mead King (born 12 September 1976) is a Filipino-Iranian television personality, fashion lifestyle host, runway coach and is the model mentor/co-judge on popular reality show, Asia's Next Top Model cycles two and three. She was listed as one of BBC's 100 Women during 2018.

Early life
Mead was born in the Philippines. Her mother, Josephine del Pilar-Mead, is a Filipina. Her biological father is of Iranian descent. When she was 4, she and her mother settled in Adelaide, Australia, with her Australian stepfather Leslie Bertram Mead. She was raised in South Australia until her early teen years.

Career 
She started her modelling career at 15, while living in Manila, then in Bangkok and Hong Kong. She picked up Australian and American accent tones from living in Australia and Asia, Joey has adapted her talent of imitating accents in work, making him a popular live & voice talent. Able to switch from Filipino, Australian, South African, American to British accents.

Currently based in the Philippines, Mead can speak basic Tagalog and understands Tagalog.

She was a video jockey for Channel [V] International in Hong Kong from 1996 to 2000. She appeared on over 30 Philippine magazine covers. She has done numerous TV commercials, ad campaigns and magazine covers in Singapore, Malaysia, Thailand, Japan and Indonesia. She has lived and worked in New York as a Ford model and is currently with Ford Los Angeles and San Francisco.

She posed naked for the cover album of Sticker Happy of the band Eraserheads.

Joey Mead King was the first Philippine model to lead in a Head & Shoulders commercial and a Lexus car commercial that both aired in Canada.

In 2008, a photo of Mead wearing the Philippine flag as a body suit on a magazine cover caused an uproar in local media. In defense, Mead said:

Yes, I wore a representation of the Philippine flag on a magazine cover. This image for me is something that is inspiring, the same way sports brands have produced their Philippine flag-inspired track sports jackets and limited edition shoes. It is the same logic why people put Philippine flag or map tattoos on their bodies...
When you’ve done as many magazine covers as I have, you’d want to do something that meant more to you — this means a lot to me, it represents my work, and I’m not embarrassed about the female form. I wanted to make a statement. I wanted to be part of something that breaks the “rules” and provoke people to think and feel...
 
She returned to Singapore in 2005 to work on entertainment show Ebuzz on AXN channel Joey interviewed many Hollywood celebrities.

In 2006 Joey hosted the World Cup series in Singapore for StarHub.

In 2008 She started work as a HBO presenter till 2009.

Her hosting skills won her work for lifestyle, corporate, red carpet and live interviews.

In 2012 it was announced that she would be the model mentor and co-judge for Asia's Next Top Model for 3 cycles.

In 2017 it was announced that she would be the co-host of Steve Harvey alongside Miss Universe 2015 2nd runner-up Olivia Jordan for Miss Universe 2016 pageant held in Mall of Asia Arena on January 30, 2017.

Personal life 

An animal advocate for PAWS Philippines, Joey is a supporter of animal rights and anti animal cruelty. She moved back to the Philippines in 2007. She married Filipino Chinese business person, managing director of Victoria Court, and car enthusiast Angelina Mead King in November 2011. In 2016, Angelina came out as a transgender woman. In 2017,  TLC premiered "The Kings", a special about the couple's relationship since Angie's transition.

References

External links
 

1976 births
Filipino emigrants to Australia
Filipino people of Iranian descent
Filipino female models
Living people
VJs (media personalities)
People from Manila
BBC 100 Women